Bossington is a village and civil parish in the Test Valley district of Hampshire, England.  According to the 2001 census it had a population of 41.  The village is located by the River Test, and is about 7 miles north of Romsey.

Bossington is a popular area for nature walks and wildlife viewing.

Villages in Hampshire
Test Valley